Sylwester Królikowski (born 2 October 1950) is a Polish fencer. He competed in the team sabre event at the 1976 Summer Olympics.

References

1950 births
Living people
Polish male fencers
Olympic fencers of Poland
Fencers at the 1976 Summer Olympics
Fencers from Warsaw